Bobby Gene Plump (born September 9, 1936) is a member of the Milan High School basketball team, who won the Indiana High School Athletic Association (IHSAA) state tournament in 1954. Plump was selected Indiana's coveted "Mr. Basketball" in 1954, the award bestowed upon Indiana's most outstanding senior basketball player as voted on by the press. Plump was also named one of the most noteworthy Hoosiers of the 20th century by Indianapolis Monthly Magazine. He was also one of the 50 greatest sports figures from Indiana in the 20th century, according to Sports Illustrated.

After graduating from Butler University, Plump played three years for the Phillips 66ers of the National Industrial Basketball League. Following his professional sports career with Phillips 66, he began working in the life insurance and financial consulting industry. "Plump's Last Shot," a restaurant in the Broad Ripple neighborhood of Indianapolis, Indiana honors him and is currently run by his son Jonathan.

Bobby Plump and his Milan High School teammates were part of the inspiration behind the 1986 film Hoosiers, starring Gene Hackman as coach of the fictitious Hickory Huskers. Hickory's star player, Jimmy Chitwood, takes his last-second shot in the championship game from the same spot Plump did in the 1954 state final.

Honors and awards
 1954 Indiana Mr. Basketball
 1954 IHSAA State championship
 1954 Trester Medal for Mental Attitude
 1957 Most Valuable Player (Butler)
 1958 Most Valuable Player (Butler)
 1958 Member College Basketball All Star Team
 1981 Indiana Basketball Hall of Fame Inductee

References

Further reading
Pieratt, Marty and Ken Honeywell Bobby Plump: last of the small town heroes, Indianapolis, Indiana: Good Morning Pub., 1997

External links
Bobby Plump at Indiana Basketball Hall of Fame
USA Today article on Milan, IN
New York Times article on Bobby Plump

1936 births
Living people
Basketball players from Indiana
Butler Bulldogs baseball players
Butler Bulldogs men's basketball players
People from Ripley County, Indiana
Phillips 66ers players
American men's basketball players
Point guards